The Vancouver Sun Run, owned by Run Vancouver Holdings ULC and sponsored by The Vancouver Sun newspaper, is a 10-kilometre road running event held in Vancouver, British Columbia, Canada, each year on the third (sometimes the fourth) Sunday in April since 1985. It is one of the largest road races in North America.

Attendance
The first Vancouver Sun Run in 1985 started with approximately 3,700 participants, and has grown significantly since:

 With over 39,000 finishers in 2006, it ranked as the 9th largest race in the world and the 3rd largest 10-km race, behind only the Peachtree Road Race in Atlanta and the Bolder Boulder in Boulder.
 The 2006 event took place on April 23 and 50,746 participants registered for the 10-km Sun Run and the 2.5-km "mini Sun Run", which was run by 2,000 people, mostly children and their parents, with some school teams participating as well.
 On April 15, 2007, the Sun Run had a record number of participants, with 54,317 people registered to participate in the 10-km and 2.5-km races, making it the largest road race in Canada, the second largest in North America and the third largest in the World.
 On April 20, 2008, the record was again broken, with 59,179 runners registered for the run making it the largest 10-kilometre race in the world. The temperature was a chilly 3 °C (37.4 °F).
 On April 17, 2011, the record was again broken, with 60,000 runners registered for the run making it the largest 10-kilometre race in the world.
 On April 15, 2012, the cool weather didn't stop 48,904 from taking part.
 Due to the COVID-19 (coronavirus) pandemic, the 2020 event was cancelled and the 2021 event operated as a virtual race.

Race details
The primary mandate of the Sun Run is to "promote health, fitness and community spirit and to support amateur athletics". In conjunction with the run a large number of 13-week clinics (including Nordic walking, walking, learn to run and run faster) are conducted at community centres throughout the province. The run is not a charity event; however, the organizers claim over $1.1 million in race proceeds have been donated to charities since 1985. It includes a relatively small number of competitive elite runners, a wheelchair race, and numerous other categories of participants ranging from running enthusiasts to parents walking with their children in strollers. The various categories start the race at different times, with the wheelchair and elite runners first, and slower runners following in numerous waves. For several years, individual runners have had their times recorded by an electronic chip attached to their shoes, which triggers a timer at the starting line and again at the finish.

The current route of the race begins on Georgia Street in downtown Vancouver, with the starting line just west of the intersection of Burrard Street, and ends outside BC Place Stadium after guiding runners through the downtown peninsula and parts of the Kitsilano and Fairview neighbourhoods south of False Creek. The run organizing committee hires numerous entertainers to perform along the route and in the stadium at the end of the race, including local humour/cover band The Neurotics, who have played at the starting line every year since 1995.

Hundreds of volunteers also assist with organizing, preparing for, and coordinating the race, including amateur radio operators involved in ARES (Amateur Radio Emergency Service) programs from the Lower Mainland.

In the aftermath of the bombings at the 2013 Boston Marathon, Vancouver Sun Run race organizers have petitioned runners to wear blue and yellow, the official Boston Marathon colours, in solidarity and remembrance of those killed and injured in Boston a week prior.

Race organizers have noted a surge in race registration in the few days after the Boston Marathon explosions as the Sun Run anticipates one of the highest turnouts in its 29-year history.

Past winners
All information taken from Association of Road Racing Statisticians.
Key = Course record

Charity
Since 1997, one dollar from each Sun Run registration has been contributed to Raise-a-Reader, a national literacy campaign.  The campaign went national in 2001, and has since raised over $10 million.

Sun Run proceeds also benefit B.C. amateur athletics through the Achilles International Track And Field Society and The Vancouver Sun Jerome International Track Classic, an annual track and field event that gives local athletes the chance to compete against some of the world's best in their own province.

Race dates
The race is held on the third or fourth Sunday of April each year.

April 17, 2011 (27th)
April 15, 2012 (28th)
April 21, 2013 (29th)
April 27, 2014 (30th)
April 19, 2015 (31st)
April 17, 2016 (32nd)
April 23, 2017 (33rd)
April 22, 2018 (34th)
April 14, 2019 (35th)
April (cancelled), 2020 (36th)
April 17, 2021 (37th)
April 24, 2022 (38th)
April 16, 2023 (39th)
 April TBC, 2024 (40th anniversary)

References

External links

Vancouver Sun Run

Sport in Vancouver
10K runs
Tourist attractions in Vancouver
Recurring sporting events established in 1985
Annual sporting events in Canada
Road running in Canada
1985 establishments in British Columbia